Hurricane at Pilgrim Hill is a 1950 American Western television film produced by Hal Roach Jr. for Magnavox Theatre. The film was directed by Richard L. Bare and starred Clem Bevans, Cecil Kellaway and Virginia Grey. The film was included in a series of hour-long television films produced by Magnavox Theatre, it aired December 8, 1950.

Plot summary

Cast
Clem Bevans as Sam "Bigmouth" Smedley
Cecil Kellaway as Jonathan Huntoon Smith
David Bruce as Tom Adams, Smith's Attorney
Virginia Grey as Janet Smedley Adams
Robert Board as Steve Terhune
Leslie Banning as Debbie Smith, Jonathan's Daughter
Syd Saylor as Sheriff Luke Arundle
Frank Lackteen as Broken Head (Running Deer in Credits)
Oliver Blake as Running Deer (Broken Head in Credits)
Billy Gray as Johnny, Bigmouth's Grandson
Ann Doran as Katie, his mother
Harry Hayden as Man on Train

References

External links

1950 films
American black-and-white films
1950s Western (genre) comedy films
Films directed by Richard L. Bare
American Western (genre) comedy films
1950 comedy films
1950s English-language films
1950s American films